The 2000 MAC Championship Game was played on December 2, 2000 at Marshall Stadium, now known as Joan C. Edwards Stadium, in Huntington, West Virginia.  The game featured the winner of each division of the Mid-American Conference. The game featured the Marshall Thundering Herd, of the East Division, and the Western Michigan Broncos, of the West Division. The Thundering Herd beat the Broncos 19−14.

References

Championship Game
MAC Championship Game
Marshall Thundering Herd football games
Western Michigan Broncos football games
December 2000 sports events in the United States
MAC Championship Game